Gomai Dam, is an earthfill dam on Gomai river near Shahada, Nandurbar district in state of Maharashtra in India.

Specifications

Purpose
 Irrigation

See also
 Dams in Maharashtra
 List of reservoirs and dams in India

References

Dams in Nandurbar district
Year of establishment missing